Leonor Odete Piuza (born 14 April 1978) is a Mozambican runner, who specializes in the 800 metres.

Piuza won the gold medal at the 2007 All-Africa Games and finished sixth at the 2008 African Championships. She also competed at the 2006 Commonwealth Games.

Piuza's personal best time is 2:01.71 minutes, achieved in June 2007 in Villefranche-sur-Saône.

Competition record

External links

1978 births
Living people
Mozambican female middle-distance runners
Commonwealth Games competitors for Mozambique
Athletes (track and field) at the 2006 Commonwealth Games
Athletes (track and field) at the 2010 Commonwealth Games
African Games gold medalists for Mozambique
African Games medalists in athletics (track and field)
Athletes (track and field) at the 2003 All-Africa Games
Athletes (track and field) at the 2007 All-Africa Games
Athletes (track and field) at the 2011 All-Africa Games